Zozan Rural District is a rural district (dehestan) in Jolgeh Zozan District, Khaf County, Razavi Khorasan province, Iran. At the 2006 census, its population was 5,972, in 1,264 families.  The rural district has 5 villages.

References 

Rural Districts of Razavi Khorasan Province
Khaf County